Iceland competed at the 2018 Winter Paralympics in Pyeongchang, South Korea, held between 9–18 March 2018. They sent a team of 1 participant in 1 sport.

Alpine skiing 

Men

See also
 Iceland at the 2018 Winter Olympics

References

Nations at the 2018 Winter Paralympics
2018
2018 in Icelandic sport